The Croatian music festivals are a series of music festivals which showcase the top Croatian musical acts, in both traditional and contemporary music. They usually involve live performances as well as awards given by festival jurors as well as from the fans. The majority of the festivals release a compilation of the songs entered.

Pop festivals 
Dora
This is the festival which selects Croatia's representative at the Eurovision Song Contest. It is organized by Croatian Radiotelevision.
Croatian Radio Festival
A popular festival which receives coverage on Croatian radio, as it organized by the Croatian Association of Radio and News. Listeners are encouraged to call in to vote for their favourite songs. Unlike other festivals, the Croatian Radio Festival has no permanent home and moves host cities each year.
Split Festival
Begun in 1960, the Split Music Festival is one of the oldest in Croatia. It has a heavy emphasis on the music of Dalmatia.
Zagrebfest
The oldest Croatian music festival, Zagrebfest is oriented towards urban chansons and schlagers. It has suffered in recent years as many of the top Croatian pop acts have been from Dalmatia.
Zadarfest
A pop music festival held in the coastal city of Zadar.
Dalmatian Chanson Evenings
Held annually in Šibenik, this festival focusses on the chansons of the Dalmatian region.
Melodije Mostara
Held in Mostar, Bosnia and Herzegovina, this festival primarily draws Croatian singers. It is organized by the city of Mostar and sponsored by Aluminij, the largest Bosnian Croat firm.
Etnofest Neum
Another festival based in Bosnia and Herzegovina, this one takes place in the coastal city of Neum. Unlike in Mostar, Etnofest only features Croatian music and focusses on music with a folk sound.
Marco Polo Fest
A somewhat smaller pop festival held on the island of Korčula.
Melodije Istre i Kvarnera
A festival held in several towns in Istria and Kvarner which focusses mostly on the regional music.

Folk festivals
Festival kajkavske popevke
Held annually in Krapina since 1966, this festival features original songs  inspired by the traditional folk music of Hrvatsko Zagorje, and sung in the Kajkavian dialect.
Zlatne žice Slavonije
A festival of both tambura and pop music held annually in Požega in late August or early September.

Rock festivals 
Urban Fest Osijek
Features less traditional Croatian music such as hard rock, alternative rock and electronica. It is held in Osijek.
Hartera
Festival is held in Rijeka, in former paper factory halls. First festival was held in 2005. and there were two stages - one for rock/alternative and one for electro music. In 2007. it was divided in two days.

Electronic festivals 
Love international festival 
Festival is held in Tisno.
Hospitality On The Beach 
Festival is held in Tisno.
SuncéBeat 9 
Festival is held in Tisno.
Soundwave Festival Croatia 
Festival is held in Tisno.
Defected Croatia 2018 
Festival is held in Tisno.
Dekmantel Selectors 
Festival is held in Tisno.
Seasplash Festival 
Festival is held in Pula.
Outlook Festival 
Festival is held in Pula.
Dimensions Festival 
Festival is held in Pula.
Unknown Festival 
Festival is held near Rovinj.

Classical 
Music Biennale Zagreb
An international festival of contemporary classical music
Dubrovačke ljetne igre
Musical Evenings in St. Donatus
A classical music festival which takes place in Zadar.
Varaždin Baroque Evenings
A festival of baroque music in the baroque city of Varaždin.
 Osor Musical Evenings
 A classical music festival which takes place in Osor on the island of Cres.

English 
Radar Festival
A summer music festival featuring foreign rock bands.

See also 
Music of Croatia

croatiafestivals.co.uk

Music festivals
Music-related lists